The Royal South Hants Hospital, known locally as "The RSH", is a community hospital in Southampton. It is managed by NHS Property Services.

History

The hospital was founded as a voluntary hospital in 1835 and moved into its first premises in St Mary Street as the Royal South Hampshire Infirmary in 1838.

The foundation stone for new premises in Fanshawe Street was laid on 10 July 1843 and the hospital opened there in 1844. Joseph and William Bullar, doctors and brothers of children’s author Anne Bullar, funded additional wards for the hospital. These wards, named the Bullar Wards, were completed in 1851. St Paul's Chapel was completed in 1857 and the Eyre Crabbe Wing, located on the east side of the site, was completed in 1868.

In 1896, another new wing, containing a further two wards and some operating theatres, was started, as well as some cottages to house patients with infectious diseases and a mortuary. This new wing was officially opened by Princess Henry of Battenberg on 7 February 1900 and named the Victoria Jubilee Wing. The hospital joined the National Health Service in 1948.

As part of proposals to transfer mental health services from Knowle Hospital, a psychiatry block was completed in 1979. The chapel fell out of use in 1992.

On 31 March 2007 management of the hospital was passed to Southampton City Primary Care Trust with several services transferring to Southampton General Hospital and the Princess Anne Hospital. In 2010 the psychiatry block was closed and a new adult mental health unit called Antelope House was opened, housing 50 acute beds and 12 psychiatric intensive care beds in a new £20 million building.

With the abolition of primary care trusts as a result of the Health and Social Care Act 2012, ownership of the hospital was transferred to NHS Property Services in April 2013. In spring 2018, Southampton City Clinical Commissioning Group announced plans to demolish the derelict psychiatry block and replace it with a care home to accommodate 150 patients. As part of the plans, the two rehabilitation wards at the RSH would also be demolished, with the rehabilitation service moving to a new facility at the Western Community Hospital.

See also

 List of hospitals in England

References

External links
National Archives entries for the RSH Hospital
Solent.NHS Trust
University Hospital Southampton

Hospital buildings completed in 1844
Hospital buildings completed in 1970
Religious buildings and structures completed in 1857
Hospitals in Hampshire
Buildings and structures in Southampton
NHS hospitals in England
Grade II listed buildings in Hampshire
1835 establishments in England
Voluntary hospitals